Chase was a comic book series published by DC Comics. It was written by Dan Curtis Johnson, illustrated by J.H. Williams III and inked by Mick Gray. It lasted ten issues (including a special #1,000,000 issue). The character of Cameron Chase first appeared in Batman #550 (January 1998) written by Doug Moench and drawn by Kelley Jones. The Batman appearance was used to promote the upcoming series.

The original Chase series was reprinted in graphic novel form in December 2011.

Fictional character biography
The series focused on Cameron Chase, an agent of the Department of Extranormal Operations tasked with monitoring and neutralizing metahuman threats to national security. A New York City resident and former private detective, Chase was recruited by Director Bones, head of the DEO's Northeastern division.

Cameron was the eldest daughter of Walter Chase. Walter led a secret second life as the little-known hero called the Acro-Bat who led of a team of altruistic, but inexperienced, heroes known as the Justice Experience. Walter was murdered by a deranged ex-scientist named Doctor Trap, who used his cybernetic jaws to tear the hero's throat out.

Doctor Trap was in reality Larry Trapp, a man who had lost his girlfriend Caroline Anders due to a public battle between the Justice Experience and their archenemies, the House of Pain, and blamed her death on all involved. Trap thereupon set about trapping and killing the members of both teams. Trap left Acro-Bat's body on the kitchen floor of the Chase family's home, where a young Cameron found it first. Her father's murder deeply scarred Cameron Chase, and left her with a deep hatred of superbeings.

Cameron has since been assigned to a number of cases, including one involving the Suicide Squad and Russian Mafia-controlled Rocket Reds in issues #2 and #3, a job watching the Teen Titans in issue #4, and the Cult of the Broken Circle in issue #5. While watching the Titans, she works with Booster Gold and Firehawk to stop an attack from the Clock King and his Clockwatchers. Her most noteworthy case involved her attempts to ascertain the true identity of the Batman, as seen in Chase #7-8. She also discovered the alternate lives employed by the shape-changing Martian Manhunter while working under Director Bones after searching for answers about the link between John Jones and the Martian Manhunter, and after examining varying statements from witnesses of a suspicious battle between J'onn J'onzz and the metacriminal Ron Gomz. She was completely unaware that she was closer to the Martian Manhunter than she would have liked to be, though he would later save her life when Doctor Trap attempted to kill her.

Cameron appeared as a supporting character in Manhunter alongside her friend and former college roommate, Kate Spencer, a.k.a. Manhunter. She was briefly in a relationship with Kate's blackmailed assistant, Dylan Battles. In Manhunter (vol. 3) #27 (January 2007), it is revealed that Doctor Trap is still alive and has kidnapped Terry. Eventually, Cameron finds Terry tied up in a wax museum with a piece of duct tape covering her mouth, furiously attempting to scream something to her beneath her gag. When Cameron removes the tape from Terry's mouth, she learns that the whole kidnapping was a setup, and is brutally attacked by Trap. At the last moment, both Cameron and Terry are saved by the timely intervention of Dylan Battles, wearing a version of the supervillain Firefly's napalm-suit.

In 2011, "The New 52" rebooted the DC universe. Director Bones eventually sends Chase to Gotham City in order to capture Batwoman, who is being investigated by the D.E.O. for possible connections to a terrorist cell. During her investigation, she discovers that Beth Kane has been resurrected, and brings her to the D.E.O. Chase attempts to arrest Batwoman during a confrontation at the Gotham waterfront, but Batwoman escapes after breaking's one of Cameron's arms.

In 2016, DC Comics implemented a relaunch of its books called "DC Rebirth", which restored its continuity to a form much as it was prior to "The New 52". Chase reappears as the Director of the D.E.O., helping Supergirl recover her powers in exchange for the latter to collaborate with the Department and its missions.

Powers and abilities
 Cameron can dampen the superhuman talents of any metahuman within her sphere of influence when she is threatened. This ability appears to be subconscious.
 Cameron is proficient in the use of a handgun, and is a skilled investigator.
 She is also an excellent computer hacker.

Other versions
A version of Cameron Chase from the original Earth-Two was seen in the pages of "Infinite Frontier". She operated as X-Tract and brought different characters to Earth Omega so that Darkseid can conquer the Multiverse and access the Great Darkness. After Darkseid's plot is thwarted and Earth Omega disappears off the Multiverse radar, X-Tract and the New Gods of Apokolips pledge their loyalty to Darkseid who state that there are other seeking the power of the Great Darkness.

In other media

Television
Cameron Chase appears in the TV series Supergirl, portrayed by Emma Caulfield. After Winslow Schott Sr. escaped from prison Cameron Chase along with several other FBI Agents went to CatCo Worldwide Media looking for Winslow Schott Jr. seeking to find out whether his father had contacted him or not. Though Winn denied his father contacting him to Chase after she thoroughly questioned him, when Cameron went to inform him that she was leaving an Agent with him just in case his father showed up, he revealed to her that his father had in actuality contacted him that morning. Chase then had Winn wear a wire when he went to go talk to his father at the arcade, barging in with her team when they had eyes on the senior Schott in the arcade. Inside, Chase demanded that Toyman put his hands up, though the latter refused causing Chase to order for her agents to open fire on him. While shooting him, they realized that it was projection of Schott, and not Schott himself. Soon after poison gas began to come out of several toys, though Supergirl arrived, sucking in the poison gas with her super breath, then flew up into the sky to release it. Afterwards, Agent Chase questioned Winn on several of the statements his father had made, though she was called away to look at something by another agent. The next day, Chase searched Winn's desk after he went missing on the day of the National City Toy Con, as she believed that Winn and his father might be working together. Later at the Toy Con, Agent Chase and her associates fired their guns at Winn after attempted to kill Chester Dunholtz, though he decided against it, firing in another direction.

Miscellaneous
An African-American Cameron Chase is featured in the Smallville Season 11 digital comic based on the TV series where she battles threats like Prometheus and Felix Faust.

Awards
The 1,000,000 issue was a part of the DC One Million storyline which was a top vote getter for the Comics Buyer's Guide Fan Award for Favorite Story for 1999.

References

External links

Cameron Chase at the DCU Guide

Comics Buyer's Guide Fan Awards

Comics characters introduced in 1998
DC Comics titles
DC Comics metahumans
Fictional private investigators
Fictional American secret agents
Fictional characters from New York City
Fictional characters with anti-magic or power negation abilities